Abando is a station on lines 1 and 2 of the Bilbao metro. The station is located in the neighborhood of Abando, in the district with the same name. The station is located close to Bilbao-Abando railway station, to which it is directly connected. It opened on 11 November 1995. It is one of the busiest stations in the network.

Station layout 

Moyua station follows the typical cavern-shaped layout of most underground Metro Bilbao stations designed by Norman Foster, with the main hall located directly above the rail tracks.

Access 

  1 Gran Vía, Biribila Plaza (Gran Vía/Plaza Circular exit)
  Main hall of the Bilbao-Abando railway station (Abando - Renfe exit)
  1 Berastegi St (Berastegi exit, closed during night time services)
   1 Gran Vía (Gran Vía/Plaza Circular exit)

Services 
The station is served by line 1 from Etxebarri to Ibarbengoa and Plentzia, and by line 2 from Basauri to Kabiezes. The station is also served by local Bilbobus and regional Bizkaibus bus services.

The station is directly connected to Bilbao-Abando railway station, the main railway terminal in Bilbao. The Bilbao tram has a stop with the same name outside the station. It is also close to the narrow-gauge Bilbao-Concordia station.

References

External links
 

Line 1 (Bilbao metro) stations
Line 2 (Bilbao metro) stations
Buildings and structures in Bilbao
Railway stations in Spain opened in 1995